Manabendranath Saha ( – 16 November 2019) was an Indian teacher and politician belonging to Communist Party of India (Marxist). He was a member of the West Bengal Legislative Assembly.

Biography
Saha was a primary school teacher and politician. He was elected as a member of the West Bengal Legislative Assembly Khargram in 2006. He committed suicide on 16 November 2019 at the age of 57.

References

Indian schoolteachers
1960s births
2019 deaths
West Bengal MLAs 2006–2011
Communist Party of India (Marxist) politicians from West Bengal
People from Murshidabad district
Suicides by hanging in India
2019 suicides